Annie van der Heide or Annie van der Heide-Hemsing (1896–1968) was a Dutch sculptor.

Biography
Heide-Hemsing née Hemsing was born on 3 March 1896 in Amsterdam. In 1921 she married Carel Christiaan van der Heide. Heide-Hemsing's work was included in the 1939 exhibition and sale Onze Kunst van Heden (Our Art of Today) at the Rijksmuseum in Amsterdam.

Gratama died on 1 July 1968 in Arnhem.

References

1896 births
1968 deaths
20th-century Dutch women artists
Artists from Amsterdam
Dutch women sculptors